Project Dragonfly may refer to 

 Project Dragonfly (space study) - the first conceptual design study that assesses the feasibility of a laser-propelled interstellar probe.
 Google's development of the Dragonfly search engine intended for use in the People's Republic of China